The Titan Games is an American sports competition reality series which aired on NBC from January 3, 2019 to August 10, 2020. Hosted by Dwayne Johnson, the show features people from across America competing in endurance-based mental and physical challenges of "epic proportions" for the title of Titan. The series is loosely based on Greek mythology. Titans are an important part of each season, it was produced by Arthur Smith's company A. Smith & Co. in association with the Universal Television Alternative Studio. At the end of the season, Titans will compete to "become the last male and female standing." The show is marketed with the tagline, "Titans aren't born, They're Made."

On September 16, 2019, NBC renewed the series for a second season, which premiered on May 25, 2020.

Development 
When announced by NBC in February 2018, the press release claimed it would be similar to NBC's 2008 remake of American Gladiators where contenders try to defeat an existing Titan, but this is not the case; newly-victorious Titans try to defend their titles in future episodes.

Competition obstacles were inspired by Johnson's personal workouts.

Format

Season One 
In each episode, four male and four female contestants compete to be named Titans. In each of four preliminary heats, two men or two women compete head-to-head; the two male winners and two female winners then compete on an obstacle course named Mount Olympus. However, the loser would take the winners' place if the winner suffers an injury and retires after winning the preliminary race.

One male and one female Titan were crowned, winning $100,000 each.

Season Two 
The United States is divided into three regions: East, West, and Central. In the regional rounds, two male and two female contestants from that region compete in two preliminary heats (three if tied), and the one male winner and one female winner race on Mount Olympus side-by-side against Johnson's handpicked Pro Titans:

Joe Thomas - Former NFL player and 10-time Pro Bowler / NFL Network Host 
Claressa Shields - Middleweight boxing champion 
Tyron Woodley - UFC champion 
Hannah Teter - Olympic gold medalist snowboarder 
Victor Cruz - NFL Super Bowl champion 
Jessie Graff - stuntwoman and American Ninja Warrior veteran.

If a contestant beats the Pro Titan in their Mount Olympus race, they take their place as the Titan of their gender and region and defend their title in subsequent episodes' Mount Olympus race, as the Pro Titan did.

In the regional finals, defeated Titans and contestants who lost Mount Olympus races return to compete in single elimination events. The final contestant runs Mount Olympus against the defending Titan for the regional championship.

The three men and three women who win their regional championships compete in the finale.

Preliminary Events

Introduced in Season 1 
 Atlas Smash: Contestants race to haul up two large concrete balls 25 feet. Each has the option to whittle down the balls with a large hammer to reduce the weight they need to lift.
 Cyclone: Contestants race to knock down five pillars, each two stories tall, with a 60-lb wrecking ball.
 Hammering Ram: Contestants use 10 lb hammers to pound against a metal plate, releasing a 350-lb battering ram to knock down a wooden door. The person who knocks it down first will then grab the victory chain.
 Championship Variation: Contestants had to first release the sledgehammer from underneath three 100-pound boxes. They then had to use the sledgehammer to pound two metal plates, each releasing half of the battering ram.
 Heavy Metal: Contestants must drag 350 pounds of metal chains up a 30-foot incline, with the weight being progressively added on with each step. After they reach the top, they must crank up a 100-lb block.
 Herculean Pull: Contestants race to pull out two 100-lb poles from a central structure, then move on to pull out the golden pole that is 9.5 feet above the ground, a blind tug of war with the other contestant.
 Lunar Impact: Contestants must climb up a ladder that is two stories high, then push against a large metal wall with their opponent on the other side. The one to overpower the other and push them off the platform wins.
 Off the Rails: Contestants must pull themselves on a 200-pound sled along a 60-foot rail, collecting 50-pound beams along the way. By the end, they are pulling 600 pounds. They then have to turn around and go back across the rail by throwing and hooking an anchor, then pulling the sled forward. The first one to pull the victory chain wins.
 Power Vault: Contestants use large metal poles to vault across five 15-foot gaps, then push over 750 pounds of weight to uncover a golden pole. They then must race back across the same gaps, plant the pole, and climb up it to pull the victory chain.
 Tower Drop: Contestants race up a large tower, having to pull out seven 15-foot poles as they ascend. Once they reach the top, they must pull out the golden pole wedged underneath a 50-lb ball. After pulling it out, they can pull the victory chain at the top of the tower.
 Uprising: Contestants are each strapped to a 40-pound anvil. They must run forward to lift the anvil to break through a series of concrete barriers, and the anvil must be driven up at a speed of at least 10 mph (16 km/h). The third barrier consists of is two concrete slabs. After all slabs are broken, the momentum should enable them to pull the victory chain. 
 Championship Variation: The second, third, and fourth barriers are all two concrete slabs thick.
 Vortex: Contestants race to raise up a large spider web-esque vortex of chains, before ascending the structure to reach the top. Some segments have metal bars making it easier to climb, but are placed in a more indirect path. The first to reach the victory chain wins.

Introduced in Season 2 
 Launch Pad: Each contestant stands on a platform and uses a rope to swing towards four slabs, each weighing 250 pounds, that are suspended on rails in the air, one off each side of the platform. The first contestant to knock all four slabs off the rails wins.
 Nuts and Bolts: Each contestant has a wall weighing nearly 2,000 pounds. Each wall has five poles, in two rows, bearing giant gold and silver bolts; gold bolts weigh 135 pounds while silver bolts weigh 80 pounds. Contestants must unscrew the endcaps securing the bolts to remove them; they must remove all weights on the two upper poles before proceeding to the lower three. When they feel they have removed enough weight, they can run to the other side of the wall, and attempt to rotate it 90°. Upon doing so, the wall will lock in place, allowing the contestant to grab the victory chain; if they cannot, they must return to the other side and remove more weight.
 Over the Edge: Contestants must drag heavy chains to reach a rope attached to a heavy block; the contestants then engage in a game of tug-of-war. The first contestant to pull the block to their end of a central platform wins.
 Kick Out: Contestants climb up to bars in front of three horizontal cylinders perpendicular to the wall and kick the cylinder flush to the wall. The last, golden cylinder is kicked by both contestants from opposite sides.
 Hammer Down: Contestants must remove a sledgehammer under three 100 lb boxes. Then, they must hammer the pins holding three vertical poles. Once the third, golden pole is down, they must climb it at an angle to reach the victory chain. 
 Three-way Variation: When played as a three-way event in the regional finals, the last contestant to finish is eliminated.
 Resistance: Contestants in a square arena are tied together with a rope secured to a center anchor, and must pull against each other to remove five oil barrels from their half over the barrier on the perimeter.

In season two, Herculean Pull and Lunar Impact also returned as events, with Herculean Pull serving as the tiebreaker event for best-of-three contests.

Mount Olympus 

In season one, competitors had to overcome a total of seven obstacles:

 The competitors sprint across the arena to knock over a 1,000-pound wall, then push three 150-pound grates uphill, and walk to the side to proceed forward
 Contestants then climb over the "Rolling Ascent," a series of large, rotating cylinders.
 Contestants must scale "The Cliffs," creating their own handholds and footholds.
 Contestants must use a crank to lift up a 600-pound torch.
 Contestants must slide down slides, separated by 5-foot, 6-foot, and 7-foot walls, to return to the arena floor.
 They must drag a sledgehammer attached to a ball-and-chain (250 pounds for men, 200 pounds for women).
 Finally, they use the sledgehammer to crack open the concrete slab covering the "Titan relic", the show's logo insignia.

The first contestant to place the relic into his or her pedestal, and turn it like a key, so the T-sign logo faces the camera, is declared a Titan.

In the Championship, the weight of the initial wall was increased to 1,200 pounds, and the ball-and-chain weight was increased to 350 pounds for the men and 300 pounds for the women. Also, to access the ball-and-chain, they had to pull on horizontal chains to lift a 500-pound cage.

For season two, the obstacles were updated:

 Starting Gates: The competitors run over two vertical wedges of different heights, then crawl under a third wedge.
 Box Flip: Contestants then have to roll a box (three times for men, once for women) and climb on top of it to reach the next obstacle
 Iron Ascent: Using two reverse-locking grips, contestants lift themselves up an incline by their arms
 Log Lift: Contestants then have to lift a pillar (200lbs for men, 100lbs for women) up an incline and lock it at the top
 Sky bridge: By lifting five weights (120lbs for men, ???lbs for women) off a pillar, competitors uncover a rope that drops half of a bridge
 Crank Down: Following this, they must rotate a 4 armed crank to release the second half of the bridge
 Cage Crawl: Crossing the bridge allows access to an angled 3 layered cage that contestants have to navigate down twice and up once
 Drop Zone: Competitors balance is tested by a series of 4 angled ledges that drop under their weight as they descend
 Ball & Chain: Similar to Season 1, the penultimate test requires aspiring Titans to drag a weighted ball wrapped in chain (300lbs for men, 200lbs for women),  and attached sledgehammer, to the end-point
 Titan Tomb: In order to grab the relic needed for victory, Titans use the sledgehammer to crack through two layers of concrete

Contestants were still required to deliver the Titan seal to a pedestal, place, and turn it for their final time.

Series overview

Season 1

Contestants
Except where noted, source for all names, ages, hometowns, current residences, and occupations:

Episode 1 (Part 1)

Episode 1 (Part 2)

Episode 2

Notes

Episode 3

Episode 4

Episode 5

Episode 6

Episode 7

Episode 8 (Battle Of The Titans)

Episode 9 (Titan Championship)

Season 2

Contestants
Except where noted, source for all names, ages, hometowns, current residences, and occupations:

Central Region

Episode 1 (Part 1)

Episode 1 (Part 2)

Episode 2

Episode 3 (Regional Finals)

West Region

Episode 4

Episode 5

Episode 6

Episode 7 (Regional Finals)

East Region

Episode 8

Episode 9

Notes

Episode 10

Episode 11 (Regional Finals)

Notes

Episode 12 (Finals)

Ratings

Season 1

Season 2 
On September 16, 2019, NBC renewed the series for a second season. Dwayne Johnson stated that season two would have a new arena, new challenges, and new competitors. It premiered on May 25, 2020.

References

2010s American game shows
2020s American game shows
2010s American reality television series
2020s American reality television series
2019 American television series debuts
2020 American television series endings
NBC original programming
English-language television shows
Television series based on classical mythology
Obstacle racing television game shows
Television series by Universal Television
Television shows filmed in California
Television shows filmed in Georgia (U.S. state)